"The Monkey's Paw" is a horror short story by English author W. W. Jacobs. It first appeared in Harper's Monthly in 1902, and was reprinted in his third collection of short stories, The Lady of the Barge also in 1902.
In the story, three wishes are granted to the owner of The Monkey's Paw, but the wishes come with an enormous price for interfering with fate.

It has been adapted many times in other media, including plays, films, TV series, operas, stories and comics, as early as 1903. It was first adapted to film in 1915 as a British silent film directed by Sidney Northcote. The film (now lost) starred John Lawson, who also played the main character in Louis N. Parker's 1907 stage play.

Plot

Mr. and Mrs. White, and their grown son, Herbert, are visited by Sergeant-Major Morris, a friend who served with the British Army in India. During dinner, he introduces them to a mummified monkey's paw. An old fakir placed a spell on the paw, so that it would grant three wishes but only with hellish consequences as punishment for tampering with fate. Morris, having had a horrible experience using the paw, throws it into the fire, but the sceptical Mr. White retrieves it. Before leaving, Morris warns Mr. White of what might happen should he use the paw.

Mr. White hesitates at first, believing that he already has everything he wants. At Herbert's suggestion, Mr. White flippantly wishes for £200,  which will enable him to make the final mortgage payment for his house. When he makes his wish, Mr. White suddenly drops the paw in surprise, claiming that it moved and twisted like a snake. The following day, Herbert leaves for work. That night, an employee arrives at the Whites' home, telling them that Herbert had been killed in a terrible machine accident that mutilated his body. The company denies any responsibility for the incident, but declares its intention to make a goodwill payment to the bereaved family.  When the despairing couple asks what the sum will be, they are told "£200". 

A week after the funeral, Mrs. White, mad with grief, insists that her husband use the paw to wish Herbert back to life. Reluctantly, he does so, despite great unease at the thought of summoning his son's mutilated and decomposing body. Later that night, there is a knock at the door. As Mrs. White fumbles at the locks in a desperate attempt to open the door, Mr. White becomes terrified and fears that the thing outside is not the son he loved. He makes his third and final wish. The knocking stops, and Mrs. White opens the door to find that no one is there.

Notable versions in other media 

The story has been adapted into other media many times, including:
 On 6 October 1903, a one-act play opened at London's Haymarket Theatre, starring Cyril Maude as Mr. White and Lena Ashwell as Mrs. White.
 A 1907 stage adaptation by Louis N. Parker starred John Lawson.
 A 1915 film version was directed by Sidney Northcote and starred John Lawson (who was in the 1907 stage play).
 A 1919 British silent film (director unknown) is known to have been made but is now considered lost.
 The Monkey's Paw (1923 film) was directed by Manning Haynes  and starred Moore Marriott, Marie Ault, and Charles Ashton.
 A 17 July 1928 UK radio adaptation was based on the 1907 play.
 The Monkey's Paw (1933 film), with screenplay by Graham John and directed by Wesley Ruggles (his last film with RKO),  starred C. Aubrey Smith, Ivan Simpson, and Louise Carter. The film was considered lost until pictures from it were posted online in 2016; the existing copy is dubbed in French.
 A 28 May 1946 episode of the BBC Radio series Appointment with Fear.
 The Monkey's Paw (1948 film), with screenplay by Norman Lee and Barbara Toy.
 A 16 December 1958 episode of the UK radio series Thirty-Minute Theatre, starring Carleton Hobbs and Gladys Young.
 A 1961 film version called Espiritismo (released as Spiritism in the US), directed by Benito Alazraki and starring Nora Veyran, Jose Luis Jiminez, and Jorge Mondragon.
 "The Monkey's Paw – A Retelling" aired on TV on 19 April 1965 in season 3, episode 26, of The Alfred Hitchcock Hour, starring Leif Erickson, Jane Wyatt, and Lee Majors.
 An episode of the 1970s British television series Orson Welles Great Mysteries.
 An 11 July 1980 episode of the CBC Radio series Nightfall.
 A 1983 Stephen King novel, Pet Sematary, is a retelling of the story.
 A 17 January 1988 BBC Radio adaptation by Patrick Galvin, presented as part of Fear on Four. It was rebroadcast individually as a Halloween special on 31 October 1993.
 A half-hour televised special broadcast on Channel 4 in 1988, directed by Andrew Barker and starring Alex McAvoy and Patricia Leslie.
 A 1993 episode named Taveez of the Indian television series The Zee Horror Show.
 A 2004 adaptation as a radio play narrated by Christopher Lee in 2004 as part of the BBC radio drama series Christopher Lee's Fireside Tales.
 A 2008 Nepali film, Kagbeni, is a loose adaptation of the story.
 The Monkey's Paw (2013 film) with the screenplay by Macon Blair, and directed by Brett Simmons.
 A 2017 opera, The Monkey's Paw, by composer Brooke deRosa and produced by Pacific Opera Project.

Variations and parodies 

A great number of novels, stories, movies, plays and comics are variations or adaptations of the story, featuring similar plots built around wishes that go awry in macabre ways, occasionally with references to monkeys' paws or to the story itself.

See also

 Unintended consequences

References

External links 

 
 "The Monkey's Paw"; full short story text
 Gaslight edition of the story 
 Monkey's Paw Radio Play
 Podcast of "The Monkey's Paw" as read by John Lithgow

1902 short stories
British short stories
Fiction about curses
Horror short stories
Metaphors referring to monkeys
Short stories adapted into films